Tanwīr al-Miqbās min Tafsīr ibn ʿAbbās (Arabic: تنوير المقباس من تفسير بن عباس) is a tafsir, attributed to Abd-Allah ibn Abbas, but which contains much atypical content for a tafsir of the sahabah. It is said to have been collected by Abu Tahir Muhammad ibn Yaqub al-Fayruz Aabadi (1329–1414).

Authenticity 
Many scholars have clarified that this work is not authentically attributed to ibn ʿAbbas. The translators of the work into English have detailed in their introduction to the work:There is no doubt that this commentary is not the work of Ibn ʿAbbas. The chain of transmitters of this commentary goes back to Muḥammad ibn Marwān  -> al-Kalbi -> Abū Ṣāliḥ which is described by Hadith experts as the chain of lies (silsilat al-kadhib), for this line of transmission is utterly dubious and unreliable. One does not even need to use the criteria for reliable transmission applied by Hadith experts to decide this commentary’s wrong attribution to ibn ʿAbbas. It is easy to detect obvious anomalies in the text of Tanwir al-Miqbas which leave one with no doubt that whoever wrote it lived many centuries after ibn ʿAbbas. One finds it, for instance, references to Hasan al-Basri, aṣ-Ṣuddi and even the grammarian Yaḥya ibn Ziyād al Farraʾ(d. 207/822).6 In a few places, after giving different meanings of the same verse, the author(s) or compiler(s) proceed(s) to say: “… and this is the opinion of ibn ʿAbbas” or: “ibn ʿAbbas says…”, forgetting that the entire commentary is supposed to be an accurate transmission of what is narrated from ibn ʿAbbas. Mufti Muhammad Taqi Usmani has written in his ʿUlūmu ul Qurʾān (An Approach to the Qurʾānic Sciences) (page 469-470):...when Muḥammad ibn Marwān aṣ-Ṣuddi as-Saghīr reports from Kalbi, this is regarded by the authorities as a false sequence ... It is wrong to ascribe it to Ibn Abbas because this book has been based on the reported sequence of Muhammad Ibn Marwaan As-Suddi from Muhammad Ibn Saa'ib Al-Kalbi from Abi Salih from Ibn Abbas (R) ... this has been regarded by the Muḥaddithīn as "chain of falsehood" and hence cannot be relied upon.Dr Bilal Philips writes in his work Uṣūl at-Tafsīr:This tafseer was compiled by Muhammad ibn Yaʿqūb al-Fayrūzabādi (d.1414 CE/817 AH), who was a Shāfiʿī scholar and author of the famous dictionary, al-Qamūs al-Muḥīt. The vast majority of this tafsīr consists of explanatory statements attributed to the great sahabi and mufassir, ibn ʿAbbas. The author mentions the chains of narrators for each section of tafsīr. Hence, this tafsīr is considered as being among the tafsīrs bir-riwāyat. However, chains of narration attributed to ibn ʿAbbas vary in their level of authenticity, depending upon the reliability of the narrators themselves. Chains from Mūʿawiyah ibn Salih and Qays ibn Muslim al-Kūfi are considered saheeh (highly authentic) and those of Ibn Is-haq (the historian) are considered hasan (authentic); while those from Isma'eel ibn 'Abdur Raḥmān aṣ-Ṣuddi al-Kabīr and 'Abdul Malik ibn Jurayj are doubtful. Those from ad-Dahhak ibn Mazāhim al-Ḥilāli, ʾAtīyah al-ʿAwfi, Muqātil ibn Sulaymān al-ʿAzdi, and Muhammad ibn as-Saʾib al-Kalabi, who was accused of fabricating hadiths, are all da'eef (unacceptable). Nearly all of the socalled "Tafseer of ibn ʿAbbas" is based on statements narrated in chains containing Muhammad ibn as-Sa'ib al-Kalabi. Hence, this tafseer is considered unreliable for the most part; and, despite its popularity among the masses, it is totally rejected by Muslim scholars. [See Mabahith fee 'Uloom al-Qur'an, Pp. 360-362 and at-Tafseer wa al-Mufassiroon, Pp.81-83]  The entire book is based on this chain of narration, which Shaykh Saleh al-Shaykh described as the weakest chain of narration from ibn Abbas, as it is a fabricated and false route of transmission.

The Egyptian scholar of hadith Abu Ishaq Al Huwayni has detailed that this tafseer is not authentic. 

The Islamic Scholar Muhammad Husayn al-Dhahabi has stated:"It is sufficient for us commenting on that is what was reported from the route of Ibn ‘Abd Al-Hakam who said, 'I have heard Ash-Shaafi‘i say, 'Nothing was authentically reported from Ibn ‘Abbaas regarding Tafseer except about one hundred Ahaadeeth.' This narration, if Ash-Shaafi‘i really said it, indicates the extent of how daring the fabricators were to invent such a huge amount of Tafseer that was attributed to Ibn ‘Abbaas. Nothing can prove that better than the apparent contradictions between narrations in that Tafseer attributed to Ibn ‘Abbaas and reported from him."In a fatwa (Islamic Ruling) from the Islamic website Islamweb.net details the following on the in-authenticity of this tafseer:Question: Is (Tanwir al-Miqbas min Tafsir Ibn 'Abbas) a authentic Hanafi tafsir?

Answer:

All perfect praise be to Allaah, The Lord of the Worlds. I testify that there is none worthy of worship except Allaah, and that Muhammad, sallallaahu ‘alayhi wa sallam, is His Slave and Messenger.

Some scholars have contested attributing the Tafseer in question to the well-known linguist Al-Fayrooz Abaadi, the author of Al-Qaamoos (a famous Arabic language dictionary). It was mentioned that a copy of it was found before Al-Fayrooz Abaadi.

Moreover, it is not correct to attribute all what is mentioned in that book to Ibn ‘Abbaas  for all what is reported from Ibn ‘Abbaas in that book is mainly reported from Muhammad ibn Marwaan As-Suddi As-Sagheer from Muhammad ibn As-Saa'ib Al-Kalbi from Abi Saalih from Ibn ‘Abbaas . Such Isnaad (i.e. chain of narrators) is one of the weakest chains of narrators from Ibn ‘Abbaas to the extent that As-Suyooti  described that chain of narrators as "the chain of telling lies."

Muhammad Husayn Al-Dhahabi  has talked about that book. Amongst his words about it: "It is sufficient for us commenting on that is what was reported from the route of Ibn ‘Abd Al-Hakam who said, 'I have heard Al-Shafi‘i say, 'Nothing was authentically reported from Ibn ‘Abbas regarding Tafsir except about one hundred Ahaadeeth.' This narration, if al-Shafi‘i really said it, indicates the extent of how daring the fabricators were to invent such a huge amount of Tafsir that was attributed to Ibn Abbas. Nothing can prove that better than the apparent contradictions between narrations in that Tafsir attributed to Ibn ‘Abbas and reported from him." [End quote]

Allah Knows best.

References

Sunni tafsir